Loughborough Derby Road railway station was a station on the Charnwood Forest Railway.

History

The station was opened by the Charnwood Forest Railway (CFR) on 16 April 1883. It was the terminus of their line from Coalville. The CFR was operated by the London and North Western Railway (LNWR) from the outset, but remained independent until absorbed into the London, Midland and Scottish Railway (LMS), of which the LNWR was a constituent, as part of the 1923 Grouping.

The LMS had another station in Loughborough, and they closed the former CFR station on 13 April 1931.

The station was demolished after closure although the goods shed remained in situ and was used by light industry until the 2000s, after which it quickly became derelict. It was later demolished and now a Lidl superstore occupies the site of Derby Road station. Only old brick walls and fencing remains in situ.

References

External links
Loughborough Derby Road Station on navigable 1946 O.S. map
 Photographs of the station

Disused railway stations in Leicestershire
Former London and North Western Railway stations
Railway stations in Great Britain opened in 1883
Railway stations in Great Britain closed in 1931
Derby Road Railway Station